Another Year may refer to:

Another Year (Leo Sayer album), 1975 album by Leo Sayer
Another Year (Nocturnal Projections album), a 1982 album by Nocturnal Projections
"Another Year" (Upstairs, Downstairs), a 1974 fourth series Upstairs, Downstairs episode
Another Year (film), a 2010 British drama film directed by Mike Leigh
"Another Year", a song by Candee Jay from the album Electrifying
"Another Year", a song by Amanda Palmer from the album Who Killed Amanda Palmer
"Another Year", a song from the album The Joy of Motion by Animals as Leaders